Zabrus distinctus is a species of ground beetle in the Aulacozabrus subgenus that can be found in Algeria and Morocco.

References

Beetles described in 1842
Beetles of North Africa
Zabrus